A sommelier ( or  or), or wine steward, is a trained and knowledgeable wine professional, normally working in fine restaurants, who specializes in all aspects of wine service as well as wine and food pairing. The role of the sommelier in fine dining today is much more specialized and informed than that of a wine waiter.  Sommeliers Australia states that the role is strategically on par with that of the chef de cuisine.

Description

A sommelier may be responsible for the development of wine lists and books and for the delivery of wine service and training for the other restaurant staff.  Working along with the culinary team, they pair and suggest wines that will best complement each particular food menu item. This entails the need for a deep knowledge of how food and wine, beer, spirits and other beverages work in harmony. A professional sommelier also works on the floor of the restaurant and is in direct contact with restaurant patrons. The sommelier has a responsibility to work within the taste preference and budget parameters of the patron.

In modern times, a sommelier's role may be considered broader than working only with wines, and may encompass all aspects of the restaurant's service, with an enhanced focus on wines, beers, spirits, soft-drinks, cocktails, mineral waters, and tobaccos.

Etymology
The modern word is French, deriving from Middle French where it referred to a court official charged with transportation of supplies.  This use of the term dates to a period when pack animals would be used to transport supplies.  The Middle French probably finds its origin in Old Provençal where a saumalier was a pack animal driver. Sauma referred to a pack animal or the load of a pack animal. In Late Latin, sagma referred to a packsaddle.

Education and certification
Though 'sommelier' is a job title potentially anyone may claim, becoming a professional certified sommelier often requires some combination of experience, training, formal education (a bachelor's degree is not required, but individuals may do a two-year associate degree), classes and examinations.  It is possible to become a sommelier by starting at the entry level in the hospitality or wine industry and working up, though many choose to become educated and professionally certified by one (or more) of the many certifying bodies.  Various certifications are offered by a wide range of educators. A very basic education in wine may be attained over the course of months at a cost in the hundreds of dollars, but advanced professional certification typically requires years of study, practice and experience costing thousands of dollars. It has been noted that a thorough education in wine is still less expensive than typical graduate school costs in the US.

The Court of Master Sommeliers
The Court of Master Sommeliers (CMS), established in 1977, is an independent examining body that offers the 'Master Sommelier Diploma', the 'Advanced Sommelier Certificate', the 'Certified Sommelier Certificate', and the 'Introductory Sommelier Certificate'. It was created under the supervision of the Worshipful Company of Vintners, the Institute of Masters of Wine, the British Hotels & Restaurants Association, the Wine and Spirit Trade Association of Great Britain, and the Wholesale Tobacco Trade Association. Since the Master Sommelier Diploma was introduced in 1969, a total of 249 people from around the world had become Master Sommeliers by the end of 2017.
The Court also offers intermediate levels of education including the annual "Advanced Sommelier Course", which prepares invited candidates to sit for the Advanced Exam, generally offered 2–3 times per year. Taking the Advanced Course and passing the Advanced Exam are mandatory before sitting for the Masters Exam.

International Sommelier Guild
The International Sommelier Guild (ISG)  educates and certifies sommeliers in Canada, China and the United States. It was founded in 1982 and the programme consists of Level 1 Wine Fundamentals, Level 2 Wine Fundamentals and a Sommelier Diploma. They also offer a 'Certified Sommelier Instructor' diploma.

International Wine & Spirits Guild
The International Wine Guild was founded in 1998 and is approved and regulated by the Colorado Department of Higher Education. The independent school offers the Level IV 'Guild Master Wine Educator Diploma', the Level III 'Guild Wine Master Diploma and Certification', the Level II 'Advanced Wine Course and Executive Sommelier Certification' and the Level I 'Introductory Wine Sommelier Certification'. The International Wine & Spirits Guild was established to encourage study to develop technical and professional understanding and increased knowledge of wine throughout all areas of the wine, spirits and food service industry. IWSG also offers professional courses and certifications for Wine Judges, Wine Instructors, and in Fine Spirits and Sake.

North American Sommelier Association
The North American Sommelier Association was founded in 2006 and is the official representative in the United States and Canada of the Worldwide Sommelier Association (WSA). Its Certified Sommelier course is divided into three phases but is offered as one entire course and includes extensive class time, lectures, educational visits to wineries, and educational dinners. Unlike other groups, NASA has only two tiers of Sommelier qualification: Silver-Pin and Gold-Pin. The Gold-Pin qualification is obtained through a series of extensive requirements and certifications (Master Wine Taster, Master Of Service...) as well as proof of experience in the industry. Aside from the Sommelier Certification, NASA also provides various smaller proprietary specialization courses, such as 'Italian Wine Specialist', 'American Wine Specialist', 'Spanish Wine Specialist' and various master-classes such as 'Master Of Terroir', 'Master of Sangiovese', 'Master of Service', and 'Master Wine Taster'.

National Wine School
The National Wine School was founded in 2009 in Los Angeles, California. The school offers ANSI-compliant professional certification for the wine trade in the United States. They offer five levels of wine certification. To earn a sommelier pin, one must complete level three certification. To earn the advanced sommelier pin, the student must complete the level four certification.

Union de la Sommellerie Française
In France, the Union des Sommeliers (UDS) was founded in 1907 to ensure social protection for its members, both sommeliers and cellar masters in Paris region. The approach and role of the association developed throughout the years as it lost its autonomy by merging with the Mutualité Hôtelière in 1959. Ten years later, sommeliers regained their independence as the Association des Sommeliers de Paris (ASP) was founded in 1969. In the same year the Association de la Sommellerie Internationale (ASI) was created and federated other organisations in the world, and in 1970 the old UDS was renamed in Union de la Sommellerie Française, UDSF, which supervises today the 21 regional associations in France (including ASP). The title of Mention Complémentaire Sommellerie (MCS) and Brevet Professionnel de Sommelier (BP) can be achieved studying for many different approved providers, and the final qualification of Maître Sommelier can be achieved after an accurate career assessment, requiring at least 10 years of professional experience.

Associazione Italiana Sommelier
In Italy, the Italian Sommelier Association, 'AIS',  founded on July 7, 1965, is one of the oldest sommelier associations of the world. It is officially recognised and legally acknowledged by the Italian government. Italian Sommelier Association is part and founding member of the Worldwide Sommelier Association (WSA),  which is officially recognized throughout the world. It is actually the largest sommelier association ever featuring over 33,000 members only in Italy. AIS / WSA is famous worldwide for its technical tasting approach and methodology, patented food & wine pairing technique, publications, service standards and three-levels course structure which leads to the Certified Sommelier qualification. A Professional Sommelier qualification and diploma is issued by AIS, after a candidate's career assessment, for those sommeliers actually working in a food and beverage establishment.

Wine & Spirit Education Trust
The Wine & Spirit Education Trust, often referred to as 'WSET', does not offer sommelier certifications. Despite this, many sommeliers choose to earn these qualifications due to similar curriculum and the WSET's structured approach that allows one to gain knowledge through tutored coursework.

Contest for the Best Sommelier in the World 
The Association de la Sommelerie Internationale (ASI) organizes the World’s Best Sommelier Contest every 3 years since 1969. The last event took place in 2019 and crowned the German candidate named Marc Almert. Due to the COVID-19 pandemic, the 17th edition of the contest will take place in 2023 instead of 2022 in Paris.

Similar professions
Other specialized beverage service roles take on the term "sommelier". These include: beer sommelier (also called a cicerone), water sommelier, coffee sommelier, milk sommelier, and  sake sommelier.

See also

 Confrérie des Chevaliers du Tastevin
 Master of Wine
 Oenology
 Vintner
 Wine accessory
 List of wine personalities

References

External links
 
 

Bartending
Food services occupations
 
Guilds in the United States